Giovanni Cirfiera is an Italian film and television actor. He is best known for portraying Santo Versace in the miniseries The Assassination of Gianni Versace: American Crime Story (2018).

Filmography

Film

Television

References

External links
 

Living people
1971 births
Italian male film actors
Italian male television actors
21st-century Italian male actors
People from Apulia